Alappuzha (Alleppey)–MGR Chennai Central Superfast Express is a class of Superfast Express train that runs daily from Chennai Central to Alappuzha. It is one of the oldest trains in the Southern Railway zone of the Indian Railways It is one of the prestigious train of Kerala.

History
The train began its life as the 41/42 Madras Central (MAS)–Cochin Terminus (CHTS) Kerala Express on 1 April 1966. It was one of two new express trains introduced in the budget of Panampilly Govindha Menon (though he did not present the budget) for southern railway. The other express train being the West Coast Express. It was the first dieseled express train to run south of Madras (with an Erode WDM-2). The scheduled departure from Cochin harbor terminus was at 08:00 pm and arrived in Madras Central at 10.00 am. The reverse train departed Madras central at 16:00 am and arrived at Cochin harbor terminus at 06:00 am (similar to timings of present-day Thiruvananthapuram -Chennai Express). It took much less time to reach Madras than the 19/20 mail (14 Hours vs 15 hours).

Initially, the 41/42 express was to be extended to Thiruvananthapuram in 1978 but instead during 1979, the 19/20 mail was extended. The 19/20 mail is the predecessor of the now Thiruvananthapuram–Chennai Central Mail. The 41/42 Express became the Cochin Express after its name "Kerala Express" was taken over by 125/126 Trivandrum–New Delhi Express.

The rake maintenance was done at Chennai Central. The train formerly used to have passenger quotas like  quota, Navjivan quota, Coromandel quota etc. for long-distance travel from Madras Central. In the 1980s the train got its stoppage removed from Coimbatore due to infrastructural constrains on the – line. By 1982, the timings of the train had been reversed. Departure from Cochin was moved to 04:05 pm and reached Madras at 06:50 in the morning. The reverse Train left Madras at 7:00 pm and arrived in Cochin at 10:00 am.

Extension to Alappuzha (1991–present) 
During 1991, the historic train bid goodbye to Cochin Terminus as it was extended to the newly inaugurated line to Alleppey. It was renumbered 6041/6042 in 1990. In 2004 the train was to be converted to Superfast express category numbered 2681/2682, but due to strong protests, the move was not implemented. It was again renumbered 16041/16042 in 2005.The Government of Kerala, in 2012, has officially asked an extension of this train to Vikram Sarabhai Terminal in the state capital of Thiruvananthapuram but the demand was never Materialized and from 23 Sep 2012, the train reentered Coimbatore junction, after nearly a gap of 30 long years after the double line via Irugur was commissioned. On 16 Jun 2014, the First Class non AC coaches were removed and have been replaced by a 3A coach. The train was upgraded to Superfast express category from 13.7.2014 with new train numbers 22639/22640.

The train's assigned number is 22639. The corresponding Chennai Superfast Express runs from Alleppey to Chennai (train number 22640).

Coach composition 
The train used to have all classes of accommodation, 1st AC, 2nd AC, 3rd AC, Sleeper class and General Sitting and it shares its rake with the Chennai–Thiruvananthapuram Superfast Express.

Accidents 

 On 6 December 1997 when the Alappuzha bound train from chennai was blasted by a bomb in Thrissur railway station killed four people and injured 49 
 Four students, who were walking along the railway track near Coimbatore under the influence of liquor, were killed after being hit by a Chennai-bound express train.
 On August 2010 Four persons, including a German couple, were killed when the Alappuzha bound express train from chennai hit a car at an unmanned level crossing near mararikulam.

Legacy 
There is a movie called Cochin Express in Malayalam which is film in the 41/42 express.

See also
Thiruvananthapuram Mail
Chennai Egmore–Guruvayur Express
West Coast Express
Kerala Express
Cheran Superfast Express
Nilgiri Express

References

External links
 Alleppey Express Route

Express trains in India
Rail transport in Kerala
Rail transport in Tamil Nadu
Transport in Alappuzha
Transport in Chennai